Abdalonimus (literally "servant of the most high gods", transliterated from the Semitic name Abd-Elonim) was a Phoenician gardener, but of royal descent, who was made King of Sidon by Alexander the Great in 332 BC.

Life
After Alexander the Great had subdued Sidon, he gave permission to Hephaestion to bestow its crown on whom he pleased. Hephaestion offered it to two brothers with whom he lodged, but they declined it, alleging that according to their laws it could only be worn by one of royal blood. Instead, they named Abdalonymus, who, notwithstanding his birth, had fallen into such poverty that he supported himself by the cultivation of a kitchen garden.

Hephaestion directed the brothers to carry the royal crown and robes to Abdalonymus. They obeyed and found him weeding in his garden. After causing him to wash, they invested him with the ensigns of royalty and conducted him to Alexander. This prince, who discerned in him an aspect not unworthy of his origin, turning to those around him, said "I wish to know how he bore his poverty."—"Would to heaven," replied Abdalonymus, "I may as well bear my prosperity! These hands have ministered to all my necessities, and as I possessed nothing, I wanted nothing." Alexander was so well pleased with this reply, that he confirmed the nomination of Hephaestion, and gave the new king the palace and private estate of Strato his predecessor, and even augmented his dominions from the neighboring country.

The so-called "Alexander Sarcophagus", discovered near Sidon and now in the Istanbul Archaeological Museum, is now generally thought to be that of Abdalonymus, though some scholars now believe the sarcophagus was that of Mazaeus, a Persian noble and governor of Babylon.

While Quintus Curtius confirms this story, as does Justin, Diodorus calls this person Ballonimus, and says he was made king of Tyre, not Sidon.  Plutarch removes the scene to Paphos, and names him Alonymus.  Curtius likely adorned the story with fictitious circumstances.

See also 
List of Kings of Tyre

References

External links 
Livius.org: Abdalonymus

People associated with Alexander the Great
Kings of Sidon
Gardeners
4th-century BC rulers
4th-century BC Phoenician people